The CFL class 3000 is a class of twenty mixed use 200 km/h Tractis type electric locomotives ordered by the Chemins de Fer Luxembourgeois (CFL) in 1995 as part of a joint order with SNCB of 80 units from Alstom.

Background, design and operation

The CFL 3000 class have the same mechanical and electrical design as the SNCB 13 locomotives. They were ordered in 1995 to replace electric and diesel locomotives dating from the 1950/60s.

The class were constructed between 1998 and 1999, and entered service from 1998 to 2001. On introduction the class experienced a number of problems relating to electrical/electromagnetic interference with track circuits, signalling systems, and issues with noise introduction onto power supplies.

The locomotives share the work on  Brussels - Luxembourg services, and exclusively work the Liège - Luxembourg trains. They are also used on freight services between Luxembourg and France/Belgium.

References

3000
Alstom locomotives
3000 V DC locomotives
25 kV AC locomotives
Bo′Bo′ locomotives
Railway locomotives introduced in 1998
Electric locomotives of Luxembourg
Standard gauge locomotives of Luxembourg
Standard gauge locomotives of Belgium
Standard gauge locomotives of France

lb:CFL 3000